Edifício São Vito, popularly known as Treme-Treme (literally "Shiver-Shiver"), was a , 27-story former residential building, located in São Paulo, Brazil, finished in 1959. Throughout its existence, the building became deteriorated and earned a reputation of São Paulo's biggest vertical cortiço (slum). The city expropriated and evacuated the building in 2004.

History

Construction and first decades 
The building was designed by Aron Kogan and built by the company Zarzur & Kogan, also responsible for the design and building of Brazil's tallest building, Mirante do Vale, located less than a mile west of São Vito. Construction began in 1954 and ended five years later. The architecture of the building was inspired by modernism and it was first conceived as a solution for popular housing, although it also had space for commercial establishments. It was aimed at liberal professionals, immigrants, travelers and people who arrived at the city and had nowhere else to go. The building was made of reinforced concrete with horizontal brise soleils. Three elevators originally served it. The top floor was an open  area, which was used for events in the 1960s.

Deterioration 

In 1985, the magazine Veja em São Paulo wrote that the building was "perhaps, the biggest concentration of people of the city, (with) three thousand inhabitants, mostly low-paid and informal workers and prostitutes". In a 2009 article, the magazine Época stated that the building started to deteriorate in the 1980s because of the population's homogeneous poverty, differently from similar buildings such as Edifício Copan, which attracted middle-class families. The deterioration was reinforced as apartments started to be split into two, and electricity started to be obtained illegally (80% of the electricity of the building was illegally supplied as of 2002). Another reason was the suspension of the waste services – rubbish was then simply thrown out of the windows., with dirty water and food. Inhabitants of the building could use the water from two artesian aquifers until 1982, when the Tamanduateí River flooded and polluted the water. Sabesp was so designated as the company responsible for the supplying of water, with a higher cost. Only one of the three elevators was still working in 2002, but it could only reach the 15th of the 27 floors, generating half-hour queues of inhabitants during the "rush hour".

At that time the building had already been nicknamed "Balança, mas não Cai" (It Shakes But it Doesn't Fall) and "Treme-Treme". To get access to the building, one must either be allowed in by someone who lives there or hold credibility among other inhabitants. Another option is to use police force. Robbery among the local population was common. Pieces of clothing left hanging to dry were the most stolen objects. Jânio Quadros, at that time mayor of São Paulo, was the first to order the implosion of the building, although it was not done. Violence inside São Vito slowly expelled people from it. In 2002, there were 150 abandoned apartments. At that time, there were plans to change the building's name to Bulevar Palace. Also, 65% of the apartments were in debt in 2002. More people started not to pay the bills when Marta Suplicy announced the implosion of the building in 2003, again with no practical results.

Expropriation and demolition 

The city hall expropriated the building in 2004, and until 25 June of that year, people started leaving the building, the last 140 families leaving it on the last day. To each expelled family, the government offered a monthly support of R$300 (some US$150) for 36 months. Originally, the building was supposed to be renovated, a project that would cost 6,2 million dollars, in 2002, so that the apartments could be re-sold to former owners mainly.

A study of viability, requested in 2005 by Suplicy's successor, José Serra, concluded that every apartment would cost more than the highest costs of the Caixa Econômica Federal's program of public housing. Caixa's program also required the surrounding areas to be "recovered and attractive". There were also projects to turn the building into an hotel, a library or a concentration of municipal secretaries, but all of them were declined.

Imploding the building was again the best option, then. It will be done manually, though, not to affect the municipal market of São Paulo, located a few meters west. Mercúrio building, built near São Vito, was only totally emptied in 2009 and is to be imploded too. Apart from both buildings, other structures started to be brought down in June 2010.

The demolition, however, has not been done since 2006, the deadline proposed by the city hall.
 The demolition is questioned in the justice by 59 owners.

The Public Defense of the State of São Paulo believe the buildings should be reformed and destined to poor families, since they are located in a special zone of social interest, though the price of the apartments in such an area like the city center would be high. A local judge ordered the demolition not to take place, until the merits of the action is judged. The companies responsible for bringing the building down were already hired since April 2010, awaiting only the end of the law processes.

Currently, the intention is to build a  square where the buildings stand. The square is supposed to be part of Dom Pedro II Park, although it has also been suggested that a day care or a garage should be built. Local merchants prefer the garage instead of the square, claiming that the garage would be used by visitors of the Municipal Market.

Through the last decades, the building became more and more deteriorated. Most of the windows are broken and the external walls are covered with graffiti. Locals claim the building is also visited by crack addicts.

Edifício São Vito and its neighbor Mercúrio were demolished in 2011.

References

1959 establishments in Brazil
2011 disestablishments in Brazil
Buildings and structures completed in 1959
Buildings and structures demolished in 2011
Skyscrapers in São Paulo
Demolished buildings and structures in Brazil
Former skyscrapers
Residential skyscrapers in Brazil